Old Henry is a 2021 American Western film written and directed by Potsy Ponciroli. It stars Tim Blake Nelson as the titular character, a farmer who must protect his son from outlaws, with Scott Haze, Gavin Lewis, Trace Adkins, and Stephen Dorff in supporting roles. The film had its world premiere at the Venice Film Festival on September 7, 2021, and was theatrically released in the United States by Shout! Studios on October 1. It was critically acclaimed, with praise to the story, Ponciroli's direction, and Nelson's performance. The National Board of Review selected the film in its annual list of the Top Ten Independent Films of the year.

Plot
Widower Henry McCarty and his son Wyatt live on a farm in Oklahoma Territory in 1906 near Henry's brother-in-law Al. After Henry and Wyatt find a lost horse with blood on the saddle, Henry locates its owner, a near-dead man named Curry. Next to Curry is a pistol and a satchel full of money. Henry wants no part of it and gets on his horse to leave the man be. But he changes his mind and brings the unconscious Curry, and the money, back to the farm to treat his wounds. Henry interrogates Curry, who claims to be a lawman and the sole survivor of a posse sent after a gang of outlaws. He asks for help keeping the outlaws from retrieving the money he managed to steal from them.

While his father goes to town for help, Wyatt secretly takes Curry's gun to practice shooting. Curry slips free and tries to wrestle back the gun, but Henry suddenly appears and overpowers him. Henry reveals that he turned back after spotting three men investigating the spot where he first found Curry. The trio, wearing sheriff's badges and led by a man named Sam Ketchum, come to the farm in search of Curry. They claim that Curry is the real outlaw but arouse Henry's suspicions when Ketchum begins asking questions about Henry's own identity and family. 

Henry does not give up Curry, and the men leave after a tense standoff. That evening, Henry has a conversation with Curry in which the latter reveals detailed knowledge of people known to Henry, which convinces Henry to undo some of his restraints. Curry tells of his experiences as a young ranch hand who witnessed the death of Billy the Kid. One of Ketchum's men, Duggan, tries to sneak under the house so he can shoot Henry from below. Henry spots him, forces Duggan out with a shotgun, and strangles him to death while Wyatt watches.

The next morning, Ketchum returns with his gang. Curry encourages Henry to surrender and turn him over, arguing that they should not die for his sake. However, Ketchum then takes Al as a hostage and, when Henry refuses to surrender, shoots him in cold blood. After stopping his son from running outside and getting killed, Henry goes into his room and arms himself with several guns, telling Wyatt "Keep your damn head down, you'll be alright". Curry recognizes the phrase as something Billy the Kid said to him years ago and realizes that Henry is in fact Billy the Kid, who faked his own death with the help of a sympathetic Pat Garrett.

Henry pretends to surrender before shooting Ketchum in the face, gunning down several men, and slipping out the back door of his farmhouse. Whilst Curry and Wyatt hold off the remaining gang members, Henry stealthily eliminates the gang until only Stilwell, the gang's tracker, is left. Stilwell tosses his guns and tries to use his throwing knife, but Henry dodges it and shoots him through the eye.

Henry suddenly comes under fire as Ketchum emerges, revealing that the shot only mangled his cheek. Both men chase and shoot at each other until Ketchum runs out of bullets, with Henry using his last shot to blow the outlaw's head off. Returning to the house, Henry is about to bandage up the injured Curry when he spots a brand on his arm used for marking criminals. Curry shoots Henry in the stomach, admitting that he was in fact a lawman, but sold out his colleagues so Ketchum's gang could impersonate them and steal the money. He was injured only because he tried to double-cross Ketchum. Curry apologizes but says that the chance to be the man who killed Billy the Kid is too much for him to resist.

Wyatt overhears all this, loads his father's shotgun, and kills Curry before he can finish off Henry. Wyatt tries to help his father, but Henry tells him that it is too late. Henry speaks earnestly to his son, telling him that the world is changing, and Henry has no place in it anymore but that he hoped his son would now find a place for himself after teaching him to be an honest man. He dies in Wyatt's arms. Wyatt buries his father next to his mother and leaves the farm along with the gang's cash, two horses, and their few possessions.

Cast

Production
In an interview, Tim Blake Nelson said starring in the 2018 Western film The Ballad of Buster Scruggs taught him how to handle a gun, "I was working with guns every day for about five months to be able to do the pistol tricks." On December 15, 2020, Hideout Pictures and Shout! Studios announced a partnership to produce, finance, and distribute three Westerns, including Old Henry from writer and director Potsy Ponciroli. According to Nelson, he was heating up his food when he came across an email that offered him the title role. He told GQ that his initial response was to say, "Well, it happened. You've been offered a character that's described as old."

During pre-production, Nelson spent six months researching how his character would sound and move. He then spent another six months working on the 100-page screenplay with Ponciroli and two months physically preparing his body to handle a gun, ride a horse, and get in shape to look like a farmer. Nelson's role in the film was confirmed on January 12, 2021. On his performance, he says he "wanted for Henry by the end of the movie to be vastly different from the character he was at the beginning of the movie, and for the audience to never be able to name a single moment where the transformation happens."

Nelson feared the public would negatively compare his role as Henry to his performance as Buster Scruggs, characters he finds to be "opposites". He spoke with Ponciroli about the issue and the pair agreed the film would not feature gunspinning; the final product features one spin during the film's finale that serves as a "punctuation". On January 14, 2021, Stephen Dorff, Trace Adkins, Scott Haze, and Gavin Lewis joined the cast. Principal photography for Old Henry took place in Tennessee between January and March 2021.

Release
Old Henry had its world premiere out of competition at the Venice Film Festival on September 7, 2021. It was released in around 30 theaters in the United States on October 1, 2021. In New York, Steve Buscemi hosted a Q&A session with Nelson at the Quad Cinema on its opening day. On October 8, the film was released through video on demand. It became a sleeper hit on VOD, staying in the top ten on iTunes for two consecutive months following initial release.

Reception

Critical response

In the United States and Canada, Old Henry grossed $42,068 at the box office.  

The film's plot and execution received generally positive reviews. From TheWrap, Steve Pond said he wished parts of the film were "more expansive" but overall described it as a "beautiful elegy" with a finale that feels "just right." Writing for The Hollywood Reporter, David Rooney described the direction of the film as a "well-crafted exercise in old-fashioned but durable genre tropes" that later "evolves into a satisfying reflection on the more complicated, somber realities behind the icons of the Wild West." In a negative review, The Guardian Xan Brooks found it to be too familiar to other Westerns and expressed doubt that the film should have been screened at the Venice Film Festival.

Furthermore, Tim Blake Nelson's performance as the title character received praise. Rooney said Nelson was able to "communicate with pathos both the regret and the steely resolve behind every beady-eyed squint." Variety Owen Gleiberman wrote that the film was "built as a kind of pedestal for Nelson's performance."

Accolades
In December 2021, the National Board of Review selected the film in its annual list of the Top Ten Independent Films of the year.

References

External links
 

2021 films
2021 independent films
2021 thriller films
2021 Western (genre) films
2020s English-language films
American thriller films
American Western (genre) films
Biographical films about Billy the Kid
Films about farmers
Films set on farms
Films shot in Tennessee
2020s American films